The Embassy of Iran in London is the diplomatic mission of Iran in the United Kingdom. It is located in a terrace overlooking Hyde Park in South Kensington, Westminster, London, next to the embassy of Ethiopia. Iran also maintains a Consular Section at 50 Kensington Court, South Kensington. The embassy building, along with the Ethiopian Embassy and the Polish Institute and Sikorski Museum, is one of a group of Grade II listed stucco buildings.

The embassy was the location of the 1980 Iranian Embassy siege in which members of the Iranian-Arab nationalist group the Democratic Revolutionary Front for the Liberation of Arabistan seized the building for several days before being overrun by the SAS. The embassy was severely damaged during the siege and did not re-open until 1993.

Following the 2011 attack on the British Embassy in Iran, the British government expelled all Iranian embassy staff and closed the embassy in protest, alleging government support for the attack. Between 2011 and 2014, Iranian interests in the UK were represented by the Omani Embassy. Anglo-Iranian relations have improved since the election of President Hassan Rouhani and the countries made plans to re-open the embassy.

On February 20, 2014 the Embassy was restored and the two countries agreed to restart diplomatic relations.

On March 9, 2018 four people from Khoddam Al-Mahdi were arrested after climbing onto the first-floor balcony of the Embassy and taking down the Iranian flag in an apparent protest against the government in Tehran due to the arrest of the Islamic scholar Hussein al-Shirazi in Qom three days earlier.

On September 25, 2022, there were angry protests outside the Embassy, mostly by the Iranian diaspora in the United Kingdom, following the death of Mahsa Amini in police custody on September 16. Demonstrators waved the pre-1979 Iranian flag and chanted "Death to the Islamic Republic". Five Metropolitan Police officers were injured and twelve arrests were made.

Gallery

References

Iran
Diplomatic missions of Iran
Iran–United Kingdom relations
Grade II listed buildings in the City of Westminster
South Kensington